Hard money may refer to:

 Hard currency, globally traded currency that can serve as a reliable and stable store of value
 Hard money (policy), currency backed by precious metal
 "Hard money" donations to candidates for political office (tightly regulated, as opposed to unregulated "soft money")
 "Hard money" funding for academic research (consistently flowing, as opposed to "soft money" provided by competitive grants)
 Hard money loans, an asset-based loan financing secured by the value of a parcel of real estate
 Hardmoney, Kentucky, a community in the United States